State Road 218 (SR 218) is an east–west state road, that consists of two discontinuous sections, in the northern part of the US state of Indiana. The road passes through a few small towns or small cities and passes through mostly rural agriculture land.

The first state road designation along modern SR 218 was SR 118 commissioned in the early 1930s along the route between SR 5 and the Ohio state line. Within the next few years SR 218 was added to the state road system along its modern route between SR 9 and SR 5, followed very soon after with the section of road between U.S. Highway 31 (US 31) and SR 21, now SR 19 being added to the state road system. The western segment was extended west to SR 25 by the late 1930s. By the early 1950s the segment of road between SR 15 and SR 9 was added to the state road system. The road near Grissom Air Reserve Base was moved onto its modern route, north of the base, by the late 1950s. By the mid 1960s SR 218 was extended east to the Ohio state line replacing SR 118.

Route description

Western segment
SR 218 designation begins as an unsigned state road, at an intersection with Old SR 25, in rural Carroll County. The unsigned section of SR 218 heads southeasterly before having an intersection with SR 25. At this intersection SR 218 designation becomes signed and continues towards the southeast. While heading southeast the road crosses a railroad track before bending to become east-west. SR 218 passes through agricultural land on its way to Camden, while in Camden SR 218 passes through an intersection with the northern terminus of SR 75, in downtown Camden. East of Camden SR 218 passes through farm and fields, turning north concurrent with SR 29. The concurrency head north passing through Deer Creek before SR 218 turns east, while SR 29 continues north.

The road leaves Carroll County and enters Cass County before passing through Walton and an intersection with US 35. The road leaves Cass County and enters Miami County, passing north of the Grissom Air Reserve Base. SR 218 turns south concurrent with US 31, passing east of Grissom Air Reserve Base, before SR 218 turns east, while US 31 continues south. After US 31 SR 218 enters Bunker Hill, making several sharp turns with in the town. Past Bunker Hill the road heads east passes through rural Miami County, before turning to become north-south for about half a mile. The road curves again to become east-west, before a curve where the road becomes north-south. Soon after becoming north-south the western segment of SR 218 end at an intersection with SR 19, near Santa Fe.

Eastern segment
The eastern segment begins at an intersection with SR 15, on the south edge of La Fontaine. SR 218 heads east passing through farmland in rural Wabash County. The road enters Huntington County and passes through a rural intersection with SR 105, followed soon after by an intersection with SR 9. Past SR 9, SR 218 has a concurrency with SR 5, the concurrency has an interchange with Interstate 69, before bending to become north-south. Soon after becoming north-south the road bends again to become northeast-southwest and enters Warren. In Warren the roadway crosses the Salamonie River, before SR 218 turning southeast, while SR 5 continues northeast.

SR 218 heads southeast, leaving Warren, before bending to become east-west at the Huntington-Wells county line. The road forms the county line for a few mile, passing through an intersection with SR 3, before completely entering Wells County. In eastern Wells County SR 218 has an intersection with SR 1 before entering Adams County. SR 218 passes through a rural intersection with SR 116, before entering the town of Berne. In Berne the road is concurrent with Main Street and passes through an intersection with US 27 and the center of downtown Berne. East of Berne the road passes through rural farmland, before curving towards the southeast. The SR 218 designation ends at Ohio state line, while the roadway continues southeast, then east, as Ohio State Route 707.

History
SR 118 was designated between SR 5, south of Warren, and Ohio state line, along modern SR 218, between 1930 and 1932. On March 28, 1932, SR 218 was commissioned between SR 9 and SR 5, in Warren. Between late 1932 and early 1933 a state road was proposed from SR 25 to SR 21, now SR 19, along the modern route of SR 218. SR 218 was commissioned between US 31 and SR 21 in either 1933 or early 1934. The road was extended west to US 35/SR 29, at the time US 35 was concurrent with SR 29, in between 1936 and 1937.

SR 218 was commissioned between SR 25 and US 35/SR 29 in either 1938 or 1939. Between 1942 and 1945 SR 218 was rerouted south around Naval Air Station Bunker Hill, now Grissom Air Reserve Base. The segment of road between SR 15 and SR 9 was added in either 1952 or 1953. The road was rerouted north around Bunker Hill Air Force Base, now Grissom Air Reserve Base, onto its modern route, between 1957 and 1959. SR 218 was extended east to the Ohio state line, along the former route of SR 118, in either 1964 or 1965. The entire roadway was paved by 1970.

Major intersections

References

External links

 Indiana Highway Ends - SR 218

218
Transportation in Adams County, Indiana
Transportation in Huntington County, Indiana
Transportation in Wells County, Indiana
Transportation in Carroll County, Indiana
Transportation in Cass County, Indiana
Transportation in Miami County, Indiana